Aaron James Morris (born 10 January 1995) is an English rugby union player for Harlequins in Premiership Rugby. His primary positions are fullback and wing.

Career
Morris started playing rugby for Bedford Junior Blues at the age of five. He played fly-half until the age of 16 but then switched to fullback; at 17 he became Bedford Blues' youngest player in the professional era.  From the age of 18 he was training with Saracens.

Morris never made a first team appearance for Saracens but also spent time on loan at London Scottish, making his debut against Munster A in the British and Irish Cup. His signing for Harlequins was announced on 18 May 2016, with Morris extending his contract in 2017 and again in 2019.

Harlequins won the 2020–21 Premiership Rugby title but Morris picked up an injury in the semi-final against Bristol meaning he missed the final against Exeter.

References

1995 births
Living people
Bedford Blues players
English rugby union players
Harlequin F.C. players
London Scottish F.C. players
Rugby union players from Bedford
Rugby union wings